Pablo Rosenkjer (8 September 1930 – 7 February 2020) was an Argentine alpine skier. He competed at the 1948 Winter Olympics and the 1952 Winter Olympics.

References

External links
 

1930 births
2020 deaths
Argentine male alpine skiers
Olympic alpine skiers of Argentina
Alpine skiers at the 1948 Winter Olympics
Alpine skiers at the 1952 Winter Olympics
Sportspeople from Bariloche